The Durham District School Board (DDSB, known as English-language Public District School Board No. 15 prior to 1999) is a public school board in the province of Ontario, Canada. The board serves most of the Regional Municipality of Durham, except for schools within the Municipality of Clarington, which instead belong to the Kawartha Pine Ridge District School Board. The Durham District School Board Education Centre head office is based in Whitby.

The school board has families of schools Pickering, Ajax, Whitby, Oshawa, and Brock-Uxbridge-Scugog, each of which has two trustees except Oshawa, which has three. Three student trustees, using a non-binding, recorded vote, represent the region of Durham. In total the school board has more than 7000 staff who serve approximately 46,000 elementary and 24,000 secondary school students.

Previously known as the Ontario County Board of Education, the board was known as the Durham Region Board of Education when it came into existence in 1974. The DRBE was renamed to the Durham District School Board in 1998 and francophone schools that were managed by this board are now part of Conseil scolaire Viamonde.

A unique program to the Durham District School Board that is running in a number of its secondary schools is called the Culture of Peace Committee, which works on a wide variety of social and humanitarian issues within the schools and in the community.

The Durham District School Board operates a gifted program in select schools. This program for students in grades 4–12 entails material being taught at an accelerated rate. Acceptance into the program is based on ranking in the top 1% of a test in mathematics, logic and literacy during grade 3.

Secondary schools
 Ajax High School
 Anderson Collegiate Vocational Institute
 Brock High School
 Brooklin High School (opened September 2015)
 Cartwright High School (closed June 2013)
 Donald A Wilson Secondary School
 Dunbarton High School
 Durham Alternative Secondary School
 Eastdale Collegiate and Vocational Institute
 G L Roberts Collegiate and Vocational Institute
 Henry Street High School
 J. Clarke Richardson Collegiate - named for local educator
 Maxwell Heights Secondary School - named after a previous school, Maxwell Heights Public School
 O'Neill Collegiate and Vocational Institute - named for long-time principal, Albert O'Neill
 Oshawa Central Collegiate Institute (closed June 2016)
 Pickering High School
 Pine Ridge Secondary School
 Port Perry High School
 R S McLaughlin Collegiate and Vocational Institute - named for Canadian auto pioneer
 Sinclair Secondary School
 Uxbridge Secondary School

Elementary schools
Located in the Town of Ajax

Alexander Graham Bell Public School - named for Canadian inventor
Applecroft Public School
Bolton C. Falby Public School - named after former town manager of Ajax
Cadarackque Public School
Carruthers Creek Public School
daVinci Public School
Dr. Roberta Bondar Public School - named after Canadian astronaut and neurologist
Duffin's Bay Public School
Eagle Ridge Public School
J. Clarke Richardson Public Secondary School
Lakeside Public School
Lester B. Pearson Public School - named for former Prime Minister of Canada
Lincoln Alexander Public School - named for former Lieutenant Governor of Ontario
Lincoln Avenue Public School
Lord Elgin Public School - named for former Governor General of the Province of Canada
Nottingham Public School
Roland Michener Public School - named for former Governor General of Canada
Roméo Dallaire Public School - named for Canadian military officer, humanitarian and Senator
Rosemary Brown Public School - named for the first black woman elected to the provincial government of British Columbia
Southwood Park Public School
Terry Fox Public School - named for famous Canadian athlete and cancer advocate
Viola Desmond Public School - named for Canadian civil rights activist and businesswoman of Black Nova Scotian descent
Valley View Public School
Vimy Ridge Public School
Westney Heights Public School

Located in the Township of Brock

Beaverton Public School
McCaskill's Mills Public School
Sunderland Public School
Thorah Central Public School

Located in the City of Oshawa

Adelaide McLaughlin Public School - 1958
Athabasca Public School - 1969
Beau Valley Public School - 1966
Bobby Orr Public School (formerly Cedardale Public School) - named for Canadian hockey legend - 2002
Clara Hughes Public School - named for Canadian Olympian - 2015
College Hill Public School - 1953
Coronation Public School - 1953
David Bouchard Public School - a Canadian author, a Member of the Order of Canada and former high school principal - 2012
Dr. C.F. Cannon Public School - 1969
Forest View Public School - 2017
Glenholme Public School - 1959
Glen Street Public School - 1971
Gordon B. Attersley Public School - 1999
Harmony Heights Public School - 2003
Hillsdale Public School - 1960
Kedron Public School - 1977
Lakewoods Public School - 1971
Mary Street Community School - 1969
Norman G. Powers Public School - 2005
Pierre Elliott Trudeau Public School - named for former Prime Minister of Canada - 1969
Queen Elizabeth Public School - named after Queen Elizabeth I - 1969
Ritson Public School - 1923
Seneca Trail Public School - 2013 
Sherwood Public School - 2003
Stephen G. Saywell Public School - 1990
Sunset Heights Public School - 1954
Village Union Public School - 1999
Vincent Massey Public School - named for former Governor General of Canada - 1959
Walter E. Harris Public School - named for Canadian analytical chemist and academic - 1971
Waverly Public School - 1969
Woodcrest Public School - 2007

Located in the City of Pickering

Altona Forest Public School
Bayview Heights Public School
Biidassige Mandamin Public School
Claremont Public School
Elizabeth B. Phin Public School
Fairport Beach Public School
Frenchman's Bay Public School
Gandatsetiagon Public School
Glengrove Public School
Grandview Public School
Highbush Public School
Maple Ridge Public School
Rosebank Road Public School
Valley Farm Public School
Vaughan Willard Public School
Westcreek Public School
William Dunbar Public School

Located in the Township of Scugog

Cartwright Central Public School
Greenbank Public School
Prince Albert Public School
R.H. Cornish Public School
S.A. Cawker Public School

Located in the Township of Uxbridge

Goodwood Public School
Joseph Gould Public School - former reeve, Member of Legislative Council of the Province of Canada, farmer, businessman 
Quaker Village Public School
Scott Central Public School
Uxbridge Public School

Located in the Town of Whitby

Bellwood Public School
Blair Ridge Public School
Brooklin Village Public School
Captain Michael Vandenbos Public School - Snowbirds pilot who died in accident in 1998
C.E. Broughton Public School
Colonel Farewell Public School
Chris Hadfield Public School - named for Canadian astronaut
Dr. Robert Thornton Public School - named for Presbyterian minister and superintendent of education in Whitby Township
E.A. Fairman Public School
Fallingbrook Public School
Glen Dhu Public School
Jack Miner Public School - named for Canadian conservationist 
John Dryden Public School - named for farmer and reeve of Whitby
Julie Payette Public School - named for Canadian astronaut, engineer and former governor general of Canada
Meadowcrest Public School
Ormiston Public School
Pierre Elliott Trudeau Public School - named for former Canadian Prime Minister
Pringle Creek Public School
Robert Munsch Public School - name for Canadian children author
Sir Samuel Steele Public School - named for Canadian soldier and NWMP officer
Sir William Stephenson Public School - named for Canadian soldier, airman, businessman, inventor, spymaster
West Lynde Public School
Whitby Shores Public School

 Williamsburg Public School
 Willows Walk Public School | 2021-present | The only known possible origin is likely because of Esquire Homes - Willows Walk, in which they seem to have made houses in the area.

Winchester Public School

Transfer to Scarborough
In 1974, West Rouge became part of Scarborough resulting in a few schools moving from the then Ontario County Board of Education over to the then Scarborough Board of Education:

 West Rouge Public School - became Junior Public School
 William G. Davis Public School - became Junior Public School
 Joseph Howe Senior Public School - became Junior Public School

See also

 Durham Catholic District School Board
 List of school districts in Ontario
 List of secondary schools in Ontario

References

External links
 
 Willows Walk Origin 

School districts in Ontario
Education in the Regional Municipality of Durham